Jack Kennedy (born 22 April 1999) is an Irish jockey who competes in National Hunt racing. He registered his biggest win when riding Minella Indo to victory in the 2022 Cheltenham Gold Cup.

Cheltenham Festival winners (10) 
 Cheltenham Gold Cup - (1)  Minella Indo (2021)
 Supreme Novices' Hurdle - (1) Labaik (2017)
 Baring Bingham Novices' Hurdle - (1) Samcro (2018)
 Triumph Hurdle -(1) 	Farclas (2018)
 David Nicholson Mares' Hurdle - (1) Black Tears (2021)
 Golden Miller Novices' Chase - (1) Shattered Love (2018)
 Fred Winter Juvenile Novices' Handicap Hurdle - (1) Veneer of Charm (2018)
 Glenfarclas Cross Country Chase - (1) Delta Work (2022)
 National Hunt Chase Challenge Cup - (1) Galvin (2021)
 Fulke Walwyn Kim Muir Challenge Cup - (1) Mount Ida (2021)

Other major wins
 Ireland
 Irish Gold Cup - (1) Delta Work (2020)
 Irish Champion Hurdle - (1) Apple's Jade (2019)
 Ladbrokes Champion Chase - (1) Outlander (2017)
 Morgiana Hurdle - (1) Abacadabras (2020)
 Royal Bond Novice Hurdle - (2) Mengli Khan (2017), Ballyadam (2020)
 Drinmore Novice Chase - (2) Envoi Allen (2020), Mighty Potter (2022)
 Hatton's Grace Hurdle - (3) Apple's Jade (2017,2018), Teahupoo (2022)
 Paddy Power Future Champions Novice Hurdle - (2) Abracadabras (2019), Mighty Potter (2021)
 Christmas Hurdle (Ireland) - (2) Apple's Jade (2018,2019)
 Savills Chase - (2) Delta Work (2019), Conflated (2022)
 Slaney Novice Hurdle - (3) Death Duty (2017), Battleoverdoyen (2019), Ginto (2022)
 Golden Cygnet Novice Hurdle - (1) Commander of Fleet (2019)
 Chanelle Pharma Novice Hurdle - (1) Samcro (2018)
 Alanna Homes Champion Novice Hurdle - (1) Dortmund Park (2018)
 Fort Leney Novice Chase - (1) Fury Road (2021)
 Bective Stud Champion Novice Hurdle - (1) Mighty Potter (2022)

 Great Britain
 Aintree Hurdle - (1) Abacadabras (2021)
 Top Novices' Hurdle - (1) Felix Desjy (2019)

References

1999 births
Living people
Irish jockeys
Sportspeople from County Kerry